The World Pond Hockey Championships is an annual international competition that takes place outdoors, on a body of frozen water, playing the pond hockey variant of ice hockey. The event takes place in the small, rural village of Plaster Rock, New Brunswick, Canada, on Roulston Lake.

History
The first World Pond Hockey Championship tournament was held in 2002. The event was created by Tom Chamberlain and Danny Braun, the director for community development of Plaster Rock and the current President and CEO of the tournament. Danny first set out wanting to organize an event to help raise money for a new recreation centre for the Tobique Valley community. So in 2000, Braun organized a fundraiser in the form of a snowmobile race. The event was popular and well received by the community, but it failed to generate a large enough profit to justify running for more than two years. It was at this point in 2002 that Braun got the idea to organize a pond hockey tournament instead. In its first year ever run, the World Pond Hockey Championship tournament featured 40 teams from the Canadian provinces of New Brunswick, Nova Scotia, and Prince Edward Island, and from the state of Maine, U.S. Unlike the snowmobile race, it was financially successful, and continued to grow with more teams registering every year. Its continued growth and popularity allowed for the construction of the Tobique-Plex recreation centre that officially opened in November, 2007. Over the past seven years that the tournament has been held, the profits from the event continue to help pay for the operating costs of the centre.

Since its debut, the tournament has greatly expanded from its original 40 teams. It now features 120 teams from 15 countries all over the world such as the United Kingdom, Singapore, the Cayman Islands, Puerto Rico, and Denmark. There are now participating teams from all of the Canadian provinces, and from 35 states from the U.S. Every year, over 200 volunteers help to maintain the ice and run the event, while over 8,000 people, including many representatives from newspapers, television networks, and other media companies, watch and participate in the tournament. In 2007, the organizers of the event received over 800 applications from teams wanting to enroll in the competition, which is significantly higher than the 100 applications they received in the first year the tournament was held. It was in this same year that the Prime Minister of Canada, Stephen Harper, attended the World Pond Hockey Championships, dropping the puck to signify the official start of that year's tournament.

Description

The World Pond Hockey Championship tournament is played in a four-on-four, round robin format. The 20 outdoor rinks allow for 40 teams to play at any given time. All competing teams consist of 4 players ages 19 and over, but they are permitted to have a fifth member in case of injury or illness. Every team is guaranteed at least five 30-minute games over the course of the four-day tournament. The playoff round starts on the Sunday of every tournament weekend, which features the best 32 teams from the previous rounds.

The Pond Hockey Championships feature some untraditional rules and notable differences in gameplay as compared to traditional hockey games. The nets that players must score on are 6 feet wide, but only 10 inches high, so all shots must be kept low to the ice. This is to ensure that pucks cannot be shot into one of the other closely situated rinks and disrupt games or spectators. There are no goalies, and players have to be over the centre line of the rink in order to score. There is also no traditional penalty box in this tournament; if any penalties are called on a member of one team, the opposing team automatically is awarded one goal.

Tournaments

See also
 U.S. Pond Hockey Championships
 Canadian National Pond Hockey Championships

References

External links
 World Pond Hockey Championships homepage

Ice hockey tournaments in Canada
Pond hockey
Victoria County, New Brunswick
Sport in New Brunswick
Recurring sporting events established in 2002
2002 establishments in New Brunswick
Pond